Lampa is a town in Southern Peru. It is the capital of the Lampa Province in the Puno Region. Lampa is situated near the lake Pukaqucha.

References

External links 

Populated places in the Puno Region